Wojciech Drzyzga (born 7 October 1958) is a Polish former volleyball player and coach. He was a member of the Poland national team from 1978 to 1985, and a participant in the 1980 Olympic Games. Drzyzga works as a volleyball commentator.

Personal life
He is married to Janina. They have two sons, Tomasz (born 1985) and Fabian (born 1990).

Honours

As a player
 National championships
 1982/1983  Polish Championship, with Legia Warsaw
 1983/1984  Polish Cup, with Legia Warsaw
 1983/1984  Polish Championship, with Legia Warsaw
 1985/1986  Polish Cup, with Legia Warsaw
 1985/1986  Polish Championship, with Legia Warsaw
 1989/1990  French Cup, with JSA Bordeaux

As a coach
 National championships
 1994/1995  Polish Cup, with Legia Warsaw

Sports commentator
Since 2003, Wojciech Drzyzga has been a volleyball commentator at TV4 and Polsat Sport, often with Tomasz Swędrowski. He comments on the most important volleyball events broadcast in Poland.

External links

 Player profile at Olympic.org
 Player profile at Volleybox.net

1958 births
Living people
Volleyball players from Warsaw
Polish men's volleyball players
Polish volleyball coaches
Volleyball coaches of international teams
Olympic volleyball players of Poland
Volleyball players at the 1980 Summer Olympics
Legia Warsaw (volleyball) players
Legia Warsaw (volleyball) coaches
Czarni Radom coaches
AZS Olsztyn coaches
ZAKSA Kędzierzyn-Koźle coaches
Setters (volleyball)